The Environmental Policy Center was established with the support of the Charles H. Revson Foundation in the year 2000 as part of The Jerusalem Institute for Israel Studies located in Rehavia, Jerusalem, Israel.  The Center conducts research, publishes its findings, runs work groups and distributes its ideas and proposals to further awareness of environmental issues. 

The center directs its work both to policy makers and to the general public, and offers assistance in the form of information and recommendations for the implementation of policy stemming from its research.

Run by Ms. Valerie Brachya, Director of the Environmental Policy Center, the primary focuses include a policy program for treatment of Israel's endangered cliff shores, the definition of indicators for determining sustainable development in the country's regional councils, environmental indicators, the establishment of metropolitan parks, and the implementation of environmental policies.

Plans for 2010 involve a focus on: 
The State of the Environment and Environmental Forecast for Israel 2030
Indicators for Sustainable Development in Israel
Water Requirements of Israel and its Neighbors
Analysis of Negotiations on Environmental Issues
Recommendations and Ways of Holding Future Environmental Negotiations with Countries in the Region
Assimilation of Environmental Considerations in the Decision-Making Process
Environmental Peacemaking – Review of the Literature and Development of the Field

Environment of Israel